Isaac Saba Raffoul (October 17, 1923 – July 27, 2008) was a Mexican businessman of Syrian Jewish descent; his father emigrated from Aleppo, Syria to Veracruz, Mexico where he started a rag business which the family built on. Isaac Saba Raffoul was one of the wealthiest persons in the world according to Forbes magazine. He had been married with wife Rebecca for over 40 years and had three sons: Moises, Manuel and Alberto.

He was the president of Grupo Xtra and chairman of Casa Saba. There has been a controversy surrounding him since he teamed up with General Electric Mexico to open up a new nationwide television channel. TV Azteca and Televisa, upon hearing this, accused him of monopolizing medicine prices in an attempt to discredit him.  According to El Financiero, there is no such monopoly. After his death in 2008, his two youngest sons Alberto and Manuel inherited the ownership of the company.

See also
List of billionaires (2005)
List of Mexican billionaires

References

External links
Profile at Forbes

1923 births
2008 deaths
20th-century Mexican businesspeople
Mexican billionaires
Syrian billionaires
Mexican people of Syrian-Jewish descent
People from Veracruz